Jeffrey Edward Hughes (born 29 May 1985) is a retired Northern Irish footballer who played as a defensive midfielder. He has also played internationally for Northern Ireland, making his debut during their 2006 summer tour of the United States. He is currently Head of Youth Development Phase at Larne.

Career
Hughes played for the Ballymena United academy, before transferring to the academy at hometown club Larne. He went on to make his Irish League debut for The Harbour Rats, before moving to The Football League in England to join Lincoln City in League Two.

He was originally deployed in the left-back position for Larne, however under John Schofield at Lincoln, he has proven that he is equally adept at playing a more attacking role as a wing-back and a winger on the left side.

Despite Hughes' three goals over two legs against Bristol Rovers, Lincoln experienced their fourth-successive play-off defeat in 2007, and Hughes moved to Crystal Palace of The Championship, reaching his highest level yet. However, he struggled at Selhurst Park. He went on a two-month loan to Peterborough United in November 2007, scoring once against Bradford City. In the January transfer window, Peterborough tried to agree terms with Hughes to sign him, but failed to do so, and thus he returned to Palace.

At the end of March, Bristol Rovers signed Hughes on a loan deal until the end of the season, but he was injured on his reserve team debut, after giving Rovers the lead. He returned to Palace for treatment, before signing permanently for Rovers in the summer.

On 30 April 2010 he was called to the Northern Ireland B national football team for a friendly against Scotland B national football team on 6 May 2010.

On 18 September 2010 Hughes scored his first professional hat-trick away to Dagenham and Redbridge, a game which Rovers won 3–0.

He was one of seventeen players released by the team in May 2011.

On 28 June 2011, Hughes signed for League One side Notts County on a two-year deal. He scored on his league debut against Carlisle United on 6 August 2011.

On 22 May 2013, Hughes signed for Fleetwood Town.

On 14 July 2015, Hughes signed a two-year contract with Cambridge United.

In January 2016, Hughes moved to Tranmere Rovers, on loan for the rest of the season, before signing a two-year deal with them in July of that year.

On 11 April 2018, Hughes rejoined his hometown club Larne on a 3-year deal. 

On 8 February 2023, Hughes announced his retirement following a serious injury, remaining at Larne in the role of Head of Youth Development Phase.

Career statistics

Honours
Tranmere Rovers
National League play-offs: 2017-18

Larne
NIFL Championship: 2018-19
County Antrim Shield: (3) 2020-21, 2021-22, 2022-23 
Individual
NIFL Championship Team of the Year 2018-19

References

External links

1985 births
People from Larne
Living people
Association football defenders
Association footballers from Northern Ireland
Northern Ireland under-21 international footballers
Northern Ireland international footballers
Ballymena United F.C. players
Larne F.C. players
English Football League players
Lincoln City F.C. players
Crystal Palace F.C. players
Peterborough United F.C. players
Bristol Rovers F.C. players
Notts County F.C. players
Fleetwood Town F.C. players
Cambridge United F.C. players
NIFL Premiership players
Tranmere Rovers F.C. players
Sportspeople from County Antrim